Vastar is a horizontally scrolling shooter released in arcades in 1983. It was released by Orca. The company went bankrupt and could not sell the game under their own brand, so they created the alias Sesame Japan Corporation to release this game.

Plot 

In the year 2956 AD, a fighting robot named Vastar was developed by scientists in order to protect Earth from the Galaxy Empire.

The game's is set in a post-apocalyptic Earth. In some points of the game, ruins of the Statue of Liberty, Mount Rushmore and the Rapa Nui (famous Easter Island's statues) can be seen.

Gameplay 
The player controls Vastar, a fighting flying robot that can shoot enemies with laser beams. Vastar is destroyed by enemy contact or strike but it is provided with a shield that must be activated to prevent attacks. When the shield's energy runs out, Vastar turns itself in an airship that still can shoot laser beams but it's defenseless against strikes. As the player reaches Vastar's base (as well if the player loses a life and restarts with another one), the shield's power is fully charged again and Vastar returns to its default form.

References

External links
 Vastar at Killer List of Videogames

1983 video games
Arcade video games
Horizontally scrolling shooters
Arcade-only video games
Science fiction video games